Goat Lake is located in Glacier National Park, in the U. S. state of Montana. The lake is a  hike by trail from the Rising Sun Auto Camp.

See also
List of lakes in Glacier County, Montana

References

Lakes of Glacier National Park (U.S.)
Lakes of Glacier County, Montana